A Painkiller is a rum cocktail with a name trademarked by Pusser's Rum Ltd, their signature drink. It is often associated with the British Virgin Islands, its place of origin. The Painkiller is a blend of rum with 4 parts pineapple juice, 1 part cream of coconut and 1 part orange juice, well shaken and served over the rocks with a generous amount of fresh nutmeg on top.   It may be made with either two, three or four ounces of rum.

History
The original Painkiller was created in the 1970s at the Soggy Dollar Bar at White Bay on the island of Jost Van Dyke in the British Virgin Islands. The inventor may have been Daphne Henderson, or George and Marie Myrick, previous owners of the Soggy Dollar. It was originally made using Cruzan Rum.

In 1989, Pusser's Rum Ltd. filed a US trademark on the Painkiller's name and recipe. When a Tiki bar named Painkiller opened in the Lower East Side of New York City in May of 2011, Pusser's sent a cease and desist order to owners Giuseppe Gonzalez and Richard Boccato, both for the bar's name and for selling Painkiller cocktails made with rums other than Pusser's. Gonzalez and Boccato reached an out-of-court settlement with Pusser's, which included them renaming the bar to PKNY. In response to the news, numerous bartenders organized a boycott against Pusser's Rum.

See also
List of cocktails
 Dark 'N' Stormy
 Sazerac
 Hand Grenade

References

External links
Pusser's Painkiller: Official Site
The History of The Pusser's Painkiller™

Cocktails with rum
Tiki drinks
Cocktails with orange juice
Cocktails with pineapple juice
Cocktails with coconut
Three-ingredient cocktails
Cocktails with dark rum